The Columns (also known as The William "Money" Williams Mansion) is a historic home in Tallahassee, Florida. It was built around 1830.  It is located at 100 North Duval Street. On May 21, 1975, it was added to the U.S. National Register of Historic Places.

The building is the present home of the James Madison Institute.  It is a former home of Benjamin Chaires.

References

External links

Florida's Office of Cultural and Historical Programs
Leon County listings
The Columns
James Madison Institute, current occupants of the site

Historic buildings and structures in Leon County, Florida
Houses on the National Register of Historic Places in Florida
National Register of Historic Places in Tallahassee, Florida
History of Tallahassee, Florida
Houses in Tallahassee, Florida
Historic American Buildings Survey in Florida